Dee Dee Davis (born April 17, 1996) is an American former actress, best known for her role as Bryana  "Baby Girl" Thomkins on The Bernie Mac Show, for which she won a Young Artist Award in 2004. She guest-starred in Strong Medicine, House, and The Game. Davis took a break from acting in 2007 to focus on school. In February 2017, Davis announced that she was pregnant with her first child.

Early life
Davis was born in Olympia Fields, Illinois on April 17, 1996. She is the younger sister of Aree Davis. She attended Rich Central High School in Olympia Fields, Illinois and Prairie State College in Chicago Heights but regards Park Forest as her home town.

Career
Davis began her career at age 5 on The Bernie Mac Show, in which she played Bryana Thomkins "Baby Girl", the title character's young niece.

Television
 The Bernie Mac Show as Bryana Thomkins (104 episodes, 2001–2006)
 House as Paige Walker (1 episode, 2004)
 Strong Medicine as Anna Cortese (1 episode, 2003)
 Larry King Live as herself (2008)
 BET Awards as herself (2005)
 14th Annual Inner City Destiny Awards as herself (2006)

References

External links
 

1996 births
Living people
American women comedians
American child actresses
American film actresses
African-American actresses
American television actresses
People from Culver City, California
People from Park Forest, Illinois
People from Country Club Hills, Illinois
Comedians from Illinois
21st-century American comedians
Comedians from Los Angeles County
21st-century American actresses
21st-century African-American women
21st-century African-American people